Copelatus speciosus is a species of diving beetle. It is part of the subfamily Copelatinae in the family Dytiscidae. It was described by Régimbart in 1892.

References

speciosus
Beetles described in 1892